The Memorial to Zhou Enlai and Deng Yingchao is a museum in Tianjin. The three-story museum is dedicated to the  memory of premier Zhou Enlai and his wife, Deng Yingchao, and features photos, documents and dioramas of significant events in their lives. Situated in the entrance-hall are the white jade sitting statues of Zhou Enlai and Deng Yingchao. In another exhibition hall there are over 140 artifacts recovered from Zhou Enlai and Deng Yingchao. 

The museum is located near the Tianjin Water Park.

See also
 List of tourist attractions in China
 Mausoleum of Mao Zedong
 Shaoshan Mao Zedong's Former Residence and Memorial Museum
 Mausoleum of Hua Guofeng
 Zhu De's Former Residence
 Zhou Enlai Memorial Hall in Huaian
 Deng Xiaoping's Former Residence and Memorial Hall in Guangan

External links
Official website of the Memorial

Zhou Enlai
Museums in Tianjin
Biographical museums in China
National first-grade museums of China